Melanomys zunigae, also known as Zuniga's melanomys or Zuniga's dark rice rat, is a species of rodent in the genus Melanomys of family Cricetidae. Known only from a small region of coastal Peru, it is listed as "critically endangered" by the IUCN and may even be extinct.

References

Literature cited
Musser, G.G. and Carleton, M.D. 2005. Superfamily Muroidea. Pp. 894–1531 in Wilson, D.E. and Reeder, D.M. (eds.). Mammal Species of the World: a taxonomic and geographic reference. 3rd ed. Baltimore: The Johns Hopkins University Press, 2 vols., 2142 pp. 
Zeballos, H. and Vivar, E. 2008. . In IUCN. IUCN Red List of Threatened Species. Version 2009.2. <www.iucnredlist.org>. Downloaded on November 15, 2009.

Mammals of Peru
Mammals described in 1949
Melanomys
Taxonomy articles created by Polbot
Taxa named by Colin Campbell Sanborn